Robert Mansel ( – after March 1219) was Constable of Antioch (1207–1219).

Life 
Robert Mansel belonged to the important Frankish Mansel family from Antioch. He was a son of Sibylla from her first marriage, who later married Prince Bohemond III of Antioch in her third marriage. On May 22, 1207, he was first documented as a constable of Antioch.

Marriage and issue 
He married a sister of Constantine of Baberon, with whom he had two sons:
Simon Mansel, Constable of Antioch
Bartholomew Mansel, Bishop of Tartus

He was last documented in March 1219.

References

Sources

12th-century births
13th-century deaths
People of the Crusader states